Lana Gordon (born August 20, 1950) is an American politician who served as the Kansas Secretary of Labor under the administrations of Governors Sam Brownback and Jeff Colyer. A member of the Republican Party, Gordon previously served as a member of the Kansas House of Representatives, representing the 52nd district from 2001 to 2012.

Early life and career
Lana Gordon was born on August 20, 1950 to Myron and Hariette Goodman in Kansas City, Missouri. Growing up, Gordon worked for her family's local hardware store in Kansas City before graduating from Shawnee Mission East High School in 1968. She graduated from the University of Kansas with her Bachelor of Science in elementary education in 1971.

From 1971 to 1972, Gordon worked as a substitute teacher before working as a full-time third grade teacher at Lee's Summit Elementary School in Missouri from 1972 to 1973. She then worked as a test administrator for the Kansas Department of Education from 1978 to 1980. Gordon was the secretary of the Topeka Unified School District 501 Citizens Advisory Council from 1982 to 1985, where she later served as a board member of the Topeka Unified School District from 1994 to 1997. From 1997 to 2001, she worked as the Secretary-Treasurer of the Cardinal Building Service Solutions before being elected to the Kansas House of Representatives. She worked as an Account Representative for BG Service Solutions/ISS from 2005 to 2012. Gordon was also a small business owner, previously owning four gift shops in the Topeka area.

She is a member of the Topeka Chamber of Commerce and United Way. Gordon and her husband, Arnold, have three children and five grandchildren.

Kansas House of Representatives

Tenure
Gordon was first elected to the Kansas House of Representatives in 2000 and was sworn in on January 8, 2001. She was elected to a total of six two-year terms, winning with more than 60% of the vote in every election. The Kansas Policy Institute gave her a 75% evaluation on its Freedom Index and the Kansas Chapter of Americans for Prosperity gave her an evaluation of 90 on conservative issues.

Committee assignments
 Education
 Health and Human Services
 Economic Development and Tourism (Chair)
 Local Government
 Joint Committee on Arts and Cultural Resources
 Joint Committee on Economic Development (Chair)

Kansas Secretary of Labor
On September 21, 2012, Governor Sam Brownback nominated Gordon to serve as Kansas Secretary of Labor.

References

External links
 Kansas Legislature - Lana Gordon
 Project Vote Smart profile
 State Surge - Legislative and voting track record
 Follow the Money campaign contributions:
 2000, 2002, 2004, 2006, 2008

1950 births
State cabinet secretaries of Kansas
Republican Party members of the Kansas House of Representatives
Living people
University of Kansas alumni
Women state legislators in Kansas
Jewish American people in Kansas politics
21st-century American politicians
School board members in Kansas
21st-century American women politicians
21st-century American Jews